FC Zimbru-2 Chișinău is a Moldovan football team, which acts as the reserve side of FC Zimbru.

Honours

 Divizia A 
Winners (3): 1998–99, 2005–06, 2006–07
 Divizia B
Winners (1): 1994–95

References

External links
Official website
Team profile at soccerway

Moldovan reserve football teams
Football clubs in Chișinău
FC Zimbru Chișinău
Association football clubs established in 1947
1947 establishments in the Moldavian Soviet Socialist Republic